XXX Action Clips Channel (also referred to as XXX TV) is a Canadian exempt English-language Category B specialty channel. It is a premium adult entertainment television channel consisting of 5 to 20 minutes clips from adult feature films from various adult film genres. It is owned by Channel Zero Inc. in conjunction with AOV Adult Movie Channel which programs and operates the service.

See also
AOV Adult Movie Channel
Maleflixxx Television

References
AOV - The Vision of Adult, Celebrates; Mediacaster Magazine, 08/25/05.
Sex Please, We're Canadian; Mediacaster Magazine, 09/01/04.

External links

Channel Zero (company)
Canadian pornographic television channels
Television channels and stations established in 2004
2004 establishments in Canada
Digital cable television networks in Canada
English-language television stations in Canada
Commercial-free television networks
Companies based in Richmond Hill, Ontario